Malcolm Thompson (29 October 1913 – 19 March 1936) was an Australian cricketer. He played in one first-class match for South Australia in 1935/36.

See also
 List of South Australian representative cricketers

References

External links
 

1913 births
1936 deaths
Australian cricketers
South Australia cricketers
Cricketers from Adelaide